Amani Peter Kyata (born 26 April 1993) is a Tanzanian footballer who plays club football for Namungo. He plays international football for Tanzania and the Tanzania U-20 National Team.

References

1993 births
Living people
People from Kilimanjaro Region
Tanzanian footballers
Tanzania international footballers
Moro United F.C. players
African Lyon F.C. players
Mwadui United F.C. players
Chemelil Sugar F.C. players
Namungo F.C. players
Association football defenders
Tanzanian expatriate footballers
Expatriate footballers in Kenya
Tanzanian expatriate sportspeople in Kenya
Tanzanian Premier League players